Bunn-O-Matic Corporation is an American manufacturer of dispensed beverage equipment (including coffee and tea) headquartered in Springfield, Illinois with a plant in Creston, Iowa. The company was founded in 1957 by George R. Bunn, who designed his own versions of equipment that had been in existence for nearly fifty years: paper coffee filters (Bunn's version had a flat bottom and fluted sides) and pour-over drip coffee brewers. Today, the corporation's products are sold under the BUNN and Bunn-O-Matic brands. The company's home coffeemakers are used throughout the United States and Canada, but the company's primary customers are institutional foodservice providers worldwide. The company introduced their first automatic drip-brew coffee maker in 1963. The company introduced their first drip brewer for the home market in 1972. The current president and CEO is Arthur H. Bunn.

Bunn is the American distributor of the Tiger Super Automatic Espresso Machine made by Thermoplan AG. The company also sells a coffee pod brewer system similar to Keurig K-Cups.

On June 26, 2020, a Bunn plant in Springfield, Il became the scene of a workplace shooting in which an employee fatally shot three coworkers before fleeing and committing suicide at another location. The motive remains unclear, according to police.

Products and Services 
Bunn-O-Matic offers a wide range of commercial and domestic food products and accessories.

The commercial sector includes several products for brewing and dispensing coffee, espresso, tea, juice, hot chocolate, and water, and a variety of filters for appliances. It is common to find touch screens and USB ports for programming on commercial models.

The company also makes various home and domestic coffee makers under the Speed Brew and Heat N' Brew families.

Bunn provides specialty foods for order or pick-up at Pease's Stores, including steaks, soups, and snacks.

References

External links

Coffee appliance vendors
Springfield, Illinois
Companies based in Sangamon County, Illinois